Tamás Gáspár (born 19 July 1960) is a Hungarian wrestler and world champion in Greco-Roman wrestling.

World championships
Gáspár received a silver medal at the 1981 FILA Wrestling World Championships in Oslo, and at the 1985 FILA Wrestling World Championships in Kolbotn. He won a gold medal at the 1986 FILA Wrestling World Championships in Budapest.

Olympics
Gáspár competed at the 1980 Summer Olympics in Moscow where he finished 9th in Greco-Roman wrestling, the heavyweight class. At the 1988 Summer Olympics in Seoul he finished 8th in the heavyweight class.

Awards
Gáspár was elected Hungarian Sportsman of the Year 1984 for winning a gold medal at that year's European Championships.

References

1960 births
Living people
Olympic wrestlers of Hungary
Wrestlers at the 1980 Summer Olympics
Wrestlers at the 1988 Summer Olympics
Hungarian male sport wrestlers
World Wrestling Championships medalists
20th-century Hungarian people